"The Little Boy Lost" is a simple lyric poem written by William Blake. This poem is part of a larger work titled Songs of Innocence which was published in the year 1789. "The Little Boy Lost" is a prelude to "The Little Boy Found".

Summary

Interpretation 
Upon the publication of "The Little Boy Lost" and Songs of Innocence, people of Blake's time perceived the compilation of poems as a children's book because it was easy to read, the poems were very short, meant to be sung, and were accompanied by colourful illustrations.

In modern times, however, much deeper understanding of the poem has developed. One can not analyse a poem by William Blake without noting its themes that come from the Christian faith. Some interpret the poem as representing the relationship between humans and our spiritual lives with the Biblical God. The father represents earthly pleasures that we might end up following. A person can become lost in a spiritual journey by acting on impulse; following drugs, a lavish lifestyle, or anything else that goes against Biblical principles. Like the little boy covered in mud, adults who have followed the wrong "god" to a life of sin are covered in that sin and completely lost.

Literary devices 
"The Little Boy Lost" is a two stanza poem with eight total lines. It is written in ballad metre (essentially a loose common metre).
In the poem Blake uses internal rhyme in line 7 "The mire was deep, & the child did weep" with the words "weep" and "deep".  This played a role in the simplicity of reading the poem. The use of caesuras throughout the poem also contributes to the easy reading, giving the reader a chance to slowly read and take in the words and meanings. The repetition words, such as "Father", put an emphasis on the meaning of Father in the piece. The title "Father" serves the use of ambiguity, because one may interpret different meaning from the word. The poem itself is ambiguous, because it has its literal meaning and religious meaning.  Blake incorporated symbolism in line 9 "And away the vapour flew", "vapour" symbolise the "Father" from the beginning of the poem.

Gallery
Scholars agree that "The Little Boy Lost" is the 13th object in the order of the original printings of the Songs of Innocence and of Experience. The following, represents a comparison of several of the extant copies of the poem, their print date, their order in that particular binding of the book of poems, and their holding institution:

References

External links

A comparison of extant copies of the original hand painted copies of "The Little Boy Lost" at the William Blake Archive

Songs of Innocence and of Experience
1789 poems